The International Skating Union has organised the European Speed Skating Championships for Women since 1970, but they were discontinued after the 1974 tournament because of lack of interest. The European Championships for Women were reinstated in 1981.

History

Distances used
 In the years 1970–1982, four distances had to be skated: 500 m – 1,000 m – 1,500 m – 3,000 m (the mini combination).
 From 1983–2017, four distances had to be skated: 500 m – 1,500 m – 3,000 m – 5,000 m (the small combination).
 Starting in 2017, in odd years, a separate competition with four distances is held: 500 m – 1000 m – 500 m – 1000 m (the sprint combination).
 Starting in 2018, in even years, a single distance championships with seven events will be held: 500 m, 1000 m, 1500 m, 3000 m, team pursuit, mass start, and team sprint.

Ranking systems used
 Since 1970, the samalog system has been in use.

Medal winners
Numbers in brackets denotes number of victories in corresponding disciplines. Boldface denotes record number of victories.

Allround championships

Sprint championships

500 metres

1000 metres

1500 metres

3000 metres

Mass start

Team pursuit

Team sprint

All-time medal count

Allround and Sprint Championships (1970–2023)

Single Distance Championships (2018–2022)

Combined all-time medal count (1970–2023)

Multiple medalists
Boldface denotes active skaters and highest medal count among all skaters (including these who not included in these tables) per type.

Allround and Sprint Championships

All events

See also 
 European Speed Skating Championships for Men
 World Allround Speed Skating Championships for Women

References
Footnotes

Medal Winners in European Allround Championships. International Skating Union (2006-04-24). Retrieved on 2007-08-25.

Recurring sporting events established in 1893
All-round speed skating